The Max-Pax Coffee Classic, also known as the Virginia Slims of Philadelphia,  was a women's tennis tournament played on indoor carpet courts at the Palestra in Philadelphia, Pennsylvania in the United States that was part of the 1973 Virginia Slims World Championship Series. It was the second edition of the tournament and was held from April 3 through April 8, 1973. First-seeded Margaret Court won the singles title and earned $12,000 first-prize money.

Finals

Singles
 Margaret Court defeated  Kerry Harris 	6–1, 6–0

Doubles
 Margaret Court /  Lesley Hunt defeated  Françoise Dürr /  Betty Stöve 6–1, 3–6, 6–2

Prize money

References

Max-Pax Coffee Classic
Advanta Championships of Philadelphia
Max-Pax Coffee Classic
Max-Pax Coffee Classic
Max-Pax Coffee Classic